"Woo-Hah!! Got You All in Check" is a song by American rapper Busta Rhymes. It was released as his debut solo single and the lead single from his debut studio album The Coming. The song was both written and produced by Rhymes and Rashad Smith. It contains additional vocals by Flipmode Squad-member and Rhymes' cousin Rampage, who at the time of the release was known as Rampage the Last Boy Scout. A critical and commercial success, the song peaked at number 8 on the US Billboard Hot 100, and also peaked at the same position in the United Kingdom and New Zealand. In the United States, the song was released as a double A-side single with several remixes of the song and the album cut "Everything Remains Raw", which also appears on The Coming, as its B-side. The single received a nomination for Best Rap Solo Performance at the 39th Grammy Awards, losing to "Hey Lover" by LL Cool J. In addition, its music video received a nomination for Best Breakthrough Video at 1996 Video Music Awards.

Viewed as a classic, it has since become one of Rhymes' most famous and beloved songs. In 2008, it was ranked number 56 on VH1's 100 Greatest Songs of Hip Hop. In 2012, Rhymes was sued by the Sugarhill Gang for copyright infringement for an allegedly uncredited interpolation of the group's 1980 song "8th Wonder".

Background
In a studio session with Rampage and record producer Rashad Smith, Smith went through his record collection and found Galt MacDermot's 1968 instrumental song "Space". Rhymes told him that he wanted to use the sample for himself, and to put the record away and save it for him. Eventually Smith produced the beat for the song using the sample and sent it to Rhymes, who could not come up with any lyrics. Seven months later, Rhymes listened to the Sugarhill Gang's 1980 song "8th Wonder" and found new inspiration through the lyric "Woo-Hah! Got them all in check", which he went on to interpolate as part of the chorus. Rhymes reused parts of the lyrics from a freestyle battle in 1995 he did with rapper Ol' Dirty Bastard, who would later feature on the remix version of the song.

Composition
"Woo-Hah!! Got You All in Check" was composed in  time and the key of C♯ major, with a tempo of 92 beats per minute. It has a duration time of four minutes and thirty-one seconds.

Critical reception
James Hyman from Music Weeks RM Dance Update rated the song five out of five. He added, "Imagine the inane style of Biz Markie mixed up with a pinch of Leaders Of The New School, Ol' Dirty Bastard (who appears on one mix) plus phat production from the likes of DJ Scratch (EPMD) & J.D. (Pharcyde, De La Soul, A Tribe Called Quest, Slum Village) and you simply have the most boisterous, most infectious and freshest rap single of the year." Daryl McIntosh of Albumism wrote that "Busta Rhymes cemented himself as a household name, by helping to add new dimensions to both the look and sound of hip-hop. […] Busta was even more energetic than we had seen and heard on “Scenario” and the "Flava in Ya Ear" reworking. His rhymes […] jumped through the speakers to connect with listeners, who still regard the rhymes as an all-time go-to quotable."

Music video
The official music video for "Woo-Hah!! Got You All in Check" was directed by Hype Williams and designed by visual artist and designer Ron Norsworthy. It begins with the first few lyrics and part of the hook of the songs B-side Everything Remains Raw, and features cameos from Spliff Star, Q-Tip and Ali Shaheed Muhammad of A Tribe Called Quest, Consequence, Onyx, and Jam Master Jay. The music video has become one of his most popular and very influential in both the hip hop and pop culture. 

Daryl McIntosh of Albumism called the music video "equally entertaining [as the song], as Busta was dressed in bright colors to correspond with vibrant backgrounds, which was a welcome break from the gloomier imagery that prevailed during the 'grimey era'".

Track listing
United Kingdom 12-inch single

United States 12-inch single

United States CD single

The World Wide Remix

"The World Wide Remix" to "Woo-Hah!! Got You All in Check" features American rapper Ol' Dirty Bastard and was released as the B-Side to the United States release of the song. It was written by Busta Rhymes, Ol' Dirty Bastard and Rashad Smith and produced by Rhymes and Smith. It features a new beat and new verses, plus a re-worked chorus. Although the song was originally not included on any album it is part of the 25th Anniversary Super Deluxe Edition of The Coming.

Background
Rhymes and ODB were very close friends and often hung out which led the collaboration to happen naturally. They later went on to collaborate on songs like Where's Your Money? in 2005 and Slow Flow in 2020, both released posthumously after ODB's death in 2004, with the later containing sampled vocals from him.

Composition
"The World Wide Remix" to "Woo-Hah!! Got You All in Check'" was written by its original contributors, Busta Rhymes and Rashad Smith alongside Ol' Dirty Bastard and produced by the first two. It is composed in  time and the key of B♭ Minor, with a tempo of 89 beats per minute. It has a duration time of four minutes and twenty-five seconds.

Music video
The official music video for "The World Wide Remix" was directed by Michael Lucero and features the two rappers as they wear straitjackets and are imprisoned in a padded room.

Charts

Weekly charts

Year-end charts

Certifications

References

1996 songs
1996 debut singles
Busta Rhymes songs
Hip hop songs
Songs written by Busta Rhymes
Songs written by Rashad Smith
Music videos directed by Hype Williams
Music videos directed by Michael Lucero
Elektra Records singles
Remix singles
Ol' Dirty Bastard songs